Bernhard is both a given name and a surname. Notable people with the name include:

Given name
Bernhard of Saxe-Weimar (1604–1639), Duke of Saxe-Weimar
Bernhard, Prince of Saxe-Meiningen (1901–1984), head of the House of Saxe-Meiningen 1946–1984
Bernhard, Count of Bylandt (1905–1998), German nobleman, artist, and author 
Prince Bernhard of Lippe-Biesterfeld (1911–2004), Prince Consort of Queen Juliana of the Netherlands
Bernhard, Margrave of Baden (born 1970), German prince
Bernhard Frank (1913–2011), German SS Commander
Bernhard Garside (born 1962), British diplomat
Bernhard Goetzke (1884–1964), German actor
Bernhard Grill (born 1961), one of the developers of MP3 technology
Bernhard Heiliger (1915–1995), German sculptor
Bernhard Langer (born 1957), German golfer 
Bernhard Maier (born 1963), German celticist
Bernhard Raimann (born 1997), Austrian American football player
Bernhard Riemann (1826–1866), German mathematician
Bernhard Siebken (1910–1949), German Nazi SS commander, executed for war crimes
Bernhard Vogel (born 1932), German politician 
Bernhard Zintl (born 1965), German pole vaulter
Prince Bernhard von Bülow (born 1849) Prince, Prime Minister of Prussia and Chancellor of the German Empire

Surname
''See also :de:Bernhard (Familienname)
Christian Bernhard (born 1963), Austrian politician (ÖVP)
Christoph Bernhard (1628–1692), German composer
Marc Bernhard (born 1972), German politician
Rudolf Bernhard (1901-1962), Swiss comedian
Ruth Bernhard (1905–2006), photographer
Thomas Bernhard (1931–1989), Austrian playwright and novelist
Sandra Bernhard (born 1955), comedian, singer, actress and author
Timo Bernhard (born 1981), sports car racer
Nadja Bernhard (born 1975), Austrian news presenter

See also 
 Bernard
 Bernhardt
 Saint Bernard (disambiguation)
 Bernhardi (disambiguation)
 Bernd

German masculine given names
Dutch masculine given names
Norwegian masculine given names
Swedish masculine given names
Danish masculine given names
Icelandic masculine given names